Krafla is a volcanic caldera of about 10 km in diameter with a 90 km long fissure zone. It is located in the north of Iceland in the Mývatn region and is situated on the Iceland hotspot atop the Mid-Atlantic Ridge, which forms the divergent boundary between the North American Plate and the Eurasian Plate. Its highest peak reaches up to 818 m and it is 2 km in depth. There have been 29 reported eruptions in recorded history.

Overview

Iceland is a place where it is possible to see plate tectonics at work.  It sits astride the Mid-Atlantic Ridge; the western part of the island nation is part of the roughly westward-moving North American plate, while the eastern part of the island is part of the roughly eastward-moving Eurasian Plate.  The north–south axis of the Mid-Atlantic Ridge splits Iceland in two, roughly north to south. Along this ridge many of Iceland's most active volcanoes are located; Krafla is one of these.

Krafla includes the crater Víti, one of two well-known craters by this name in Iceland (the other is in Askja). The Icelandic word "víti" means "hell". In former times, people often believed hell to be under volcanoes. Víti has a green lake inside of it.

South of the Krafla area, but not actually within the caldera is Námafjall, a mountain, beneath which is Hverir, a geothermal area with boiling mudpools and steaming fumaroles.

History

The Mývatn fires occurred between 1724 and 1729, when many of the fissure vents opened up. The lava fountains could be seen in the south of the island, and a lava flow destroyed three farms near the village of Reykjahlíð, although nobody was harmed.

Between 1975 and 1984 there was an volcanic episode within the Krafla volcano, known as the Krafla fires. It involved nine volcanic eruptions and fifteen uplift and subsidence events. This interrupted some of the Krafla drillfields. During these events a large magma chamber was identified at depth by analysing the seismic activity. Some of the spectacular fire-fountaining during these eruptions was caught on film by Maurice and Katia Krafft, and features in the 2022 film, Fire of Love.

Since 1977 the Krafla area has been the source of the geothermal energy used by a 60 MWe power station. A survey undertaken in 2006 indicated very high temperatures at depths of between 3 and 5 kilometres, and these favourable conditions led to the development of the first well from the Iceland Deep Drilling Project, IDDP-1, that found molten rhyolite magma 2.1 km deep beneath the surface in 2009.

Krafla magma testbed
Following on from the encounter with molten rock during the drilling of IDDP-1, the Krafla Magma Testbed (KMT) concept has been developed, which envisages the creation of an 'international magma observatory' and further scientific drilling at Krafla in order to deliberately drill into the magma body.

Photogallery

See also
 Geography of Iceland
 List of lakes of Iceland
 List of volcanoes in Iceland
 Volcanism of Iceland
 Geothermal power in Iceland

References

External links

 Krafla  in the Catalogue of Icelandic Volcanoes
 
 Volcanism
 Photos of Krafla and Reykjahlíð (among others)
 Univ. of Iceland: Information about Krafla
 Energy from magma at Krafla

Volcanoes of Iceland
Mountains of Iceland
Active volcanoes
Volcanic crater lakes
VEI-4 volcanoes
Fissure vents
North Volcanic Zone of Iceland
Volcanic systems of Iceland
Calderas of Iceland